Campbell Avenue Complex, also known as the Trinkle Buildings, is a historic commercial block and national historic district located at Roanoke, Virginia.  It encompasses five contributing buildings constructed between 1892 and 1909.  The contiguous three-story buildings are constructed of brick over stone foundations.  The buildings have a horizontal arrangement of windows above first-floor storefronts and include buildings representative of the Beaux Arts and Tudor Revival styles.

It was listed on the National Register of Historic Places in 1991.

References

Historic districts on the National Register of Historic Places in Virginia
Commercial buildings on the National Register of Historic Places in Virginia
Tudor Revival architecture in Virginia
Beaux-Arts architecture in Virginia
Commercial buildings completed in 1909
Buildings and structures in Roanoke, Virginia
National Register of Historic Places in Roanoke, Virginia
Individually listed contributing properties to historic districts on the National Register in Virginia